Kenneth Allan Still (February 12, 1935 – March 19, 2017) was an American professional golfer who played on both the PGA Tour and the Senior PGA Tour.

Still was born in Tacoma, Washington. During his early twenties, he developed a friendship with Los Angeles Dodgers pitchers Sandy Koufax and Don Drysdale. He turned professional in 1953.

Still won three PGA Tour events. In 1969 he won the Florida Citrus Open Invitational in Orlando in the spring, and the Greater Milwaukee Open in the summer.

Still took part in the 1969 Ryder Cup matches. While playing a match with Dave Hill against Brian Huggett and Bernard Gallacher, Still and Hill lost a hole after Hill putted out of turn.  While upset with what took place, Hill later said "well we won. So let's forget about it."  In the final singles encounter Jack Nicklaus had Tony Jacklin pick up a missable putt so the match would end in a 16-16 tie.

Still had two top-10 finishes in major championships during his career: a 5th-place finish at the 1970 U.S. Open, and a T-6 at The Masters in 1971. After reaching the age of 50 in 1985, he began play on the Senior PGA Tour and continued to play in this venue until the late 1990s. He lived in Fircrest, Washington where February 12, his birthday, is recognized as Ken Still Day.

Still was elected to the Pacific Northwest Section PGA Hall of Fame in 1995.

Professional wins (5)

PGA Tour wins (3)

PGA Tour playoff record (1–0)

Other wins (2)
this list may be incomplete
1964 British Columbia Open
1966 Washington Open

References

External links

American male golfers
PGA Tour golfers
PGA Tour Champions golfers
Ryder Cup competitors for the United States
Golfers from Washington (state)
Sportspeople from Tacoma, Washington
1935 births
2017 deaths